Staburadze may refer to
Staburadze or Staburags, a former landmark on the bank of Daugava river
Staburadze, a character in the national epic of Latvia Lāčplēsis
Staburadze, a character in Lāčplēsis (rock opera)
Staburadze, a Latvian confectionery brand of Orkla Group affiliated with Laima
Staburadze, a Latvian student sorority established in 1947